Jay Russell (born 1961) is an American-born, UK-based author of crime, horror and fantasy fiction.  He is the creator of Marty Burns, a supernatural detective, who has appeared in a series of novels and short stories beginning with Celestial Dogs.  Russell's fiction is typified by a mixing of genre elements, often overlaid with a comic sensibility.

Russell was born in Queens County in New York City.  He attended Cornell University.   He later attended the University of Southern California, receiving a doctorate in communications.

He currently teaches creative writing at the esteemed St Mary's University, Twickenham.

Bibliography

 Celestial Dogs (1996) 
 Blood (1996)
 Burning Bright (1997) 
 Waltzes and Whispers (1999) 
 Greed & Stuff (2001)
 Brown Harvest (2001) 
 Twilight Zone: Memphis/The Pool Guy (2004) 
 Apocalypse Now, Voyager (2005)
 If Happy little bluebirds fly

External links  
  Jay Russell web page

1961 births
Living people
USC Annenberg School for Communication and Journalism alumni
Cornell University alumni
American male novelists